The Atlantic jackknife clam, Ensis leei, also known as the bamboo clam, American jackknife clam or razor clam, is a large edible marine bivalve mollusc found on the North American Atlantic coast, from Canada to South Carolina. The species has also been introduced to Europe. The name "razor clam" is also used to refer to different species such as the Pacific razor clam (Siliqua patula) or Razor shell (Ensis magnus).

Jackknife clams live in sand and mud and are found in intertidal or subtidal zones in bays and estuaries. Its streamlined shell and strong foot allow Jackknife clams to burrow quickly in wet sand. Jackknife clams are also able to swim by propelling jets of water out of their shells. The Jackknife clam gets its name from their shell's extremely sharp rim and the overall shape bearing a strong resemblance to an old fashioned straight razor. Beachgoers can be injured when the shell is accidentally stepped on.

At low tide the position of the Atlantic jackknife clam is revealed by a keyhole-shaped opening in the sand; when the clam is disturbed, a small jet of water squirts from this opening as the clam starts to dig. This species' remarkable speed in digging can easily outstrip a human digger, making the clam difficult to catch. Amos Winter of MIT has studied razor clams and how they bury themselves, in part by using a repurposed ant farm and glass beads. 

Thus the species is not often commercially fished, even though it is widely regarded as a delicacy: in coastal Massachusetts, they are sought after in the summer by locals to make home cooked clam strips and most towns have ordinances regulating how many can be taken at a time. The easiest way to catch jackknives is to pour salt on the characteristic breathing holes. The clam will try to escape the salt by coming up out of its hole, at which point you can gently grab the shell and pull it out of the ground.

Predators of Ensis directus other than humans include birds, such as the ring-billed gull (Larus delawarensis) in North America and the Eurasian oystercatcher (Haematopus ostralegus) in Europe, and the nemertean worm Cerebratulus lacteus.

The Atlantic jackknife clam is now also found in northwestern Europe, where it is regarded as a harmful exotic species. It was first recorded in Europe in 1978/79, in the Elbe estuary.

The Atlantic jackknife clam has inspired a kind of biomimetic anchor in development by a team at the Massachusetts Institute of Technology, adapting the clam's digging method for use in keeping undersea cables and potentially watercraft anchored securely.

See also
 Jackknife clam which is also found in the Pacific Ocean.
Solen strictus Gould's razor shell found mostly in Japan.
 Ensis Atlantic razor-shell crustaceans also known by similar names in Western Europe such as couteaux de mer  (in France) and navajas (in Spain)

References

 The Long Island Shell Club, 1988. The Seashells of Long Island, the Long Island Shell Club Inc, New York State

External links

 Animal Diversity Web: "Ensis directus" — Camponelli, K. 2001 . accessed August 27, 2006
 Early life history characteristics of the razor clam (Ensis directus) and the moonsnails (Euspira spp.) with applications to fisheries and aquaculture — Kenchington, E., R. Duggan and T. Riddell. 1998.  Can. Tech. Rep. Fish. Aquat. Sci. 2223: vii + 32 pgs. 
 Gollasch Consulting. Exotics Across the Ocean - EU Concerted Action. Ensis directus 

Pharidae
Marine molluscs of North America
Molluscs of the Atlantic Ocean
Fauna of the Northeastern United States
Fauna of the Southeastern United States
Bivalves described in 1843